Santa Gertrudis Air Force Base (11th Air Force Base "Lieutenant Colonel Juan Pablo Aldasoro Suárez")  is a military airport located in the municipality of Saucillo, Chihuahua.

Facilities 
It has a 8,700 feet long and 148 feet wide runway, as well an 1,165 feet x 328 feet (382,120 square feet) aviation platform. In this air force base operates permanently the Escuela Militar de Aplicación AeroTáctica de la Fuerza Aérea "E.M.A.A.T.F.A." (Air Force Military School for AeroTactical Applications) with T-6C Texan II aircraft to train and update the staff and aviator pilot officers of Mexican Air Force, to serve as auxiliaries or advisors of command in corporation-type organizations.

E.M.A.A.T.F.A. also prepares pilots to operate aircraft performing different activities such as training, night flights, reconnaissance of the area, air-to-ground firing practices with machine guns, bombs and rockets.

there are plans to move E.M.A.A.T.F.A. to Zapopan Air Force Base, but an air squad with base in Santa Gertrudis will be created for support activities in the zone.

Accidents and incidents 
 On November 25, 1983 a Mexican Air Force Northrop F-5E Tiger II aircraft with registration 4002 crashed during a bombing and attack on land targets training at the Santa Gertrudis Air Base, killing his pilot and causing irreparable damage to the aircraft.

References

External links 
 SEDENA

Airports in Chihuahua (state)
Mexican Air Force